The Brielse Maas is a dammed river between the North Sea and the Oude Maas in the southern part of the Dutch province of South Holland. The town of Brielle, which gave it its name, is located on the south bank. The Brielse Maas was dammed before the flood of 1953.

Originally the Brielse Maas was part of the Nieuwe Maas: at the Vondelingenplaat the Oude Maas and the Nieuwe Maas came together and split into the Brielse Maas and the Scheur. The area between Scheur and Brielse Maas was the island of Rozenburg.

The damming of the Brielse Maas was part of an extensive plan to make the islands of Rozenburg, Voorne-Putten and Welplaat into one water management unit. This was necessary because of the harmful effects of the increased salinization of fresh water. The works also consisted of a dam in the Botlek, a canal through the Hartel area and a system of fencing, drainage and inlet locks.

In 1949, the construction of a dam, the Brielse Maasdam over the 900 meter wide salt marsh on the south side of the island of Rozenburg, was started. In 1950, the dam was built on the deeper places with 75 small caissons. Eventually, a sixty-meter wide closing hole remained, which was closed with a Phoenix caisson in July 1950.

The dam through the Botlek was also closed in June 1950 with the help of small caissons. The water in between was since then called Brielse Meer and is now a large freshwater basin and recreational area for Rijnmond and the surrounding area. The lake is connected to the Oude Maas via locks at Spijkenisse, freshwater from the Spui can be let in via the Bernisse.

Geography of Rotterdam
Rivers of South Holland
Rivers of the Netherlands